The 1940 Ukrainian Cup was a football knockout competition conducting by the Football Federation of the Ukrainian SSR and was known as the Ukrainian Cup.

Competition schedule

First elimination round

Second elimination round

Third elimination round

Quarterfinals

Semifinals

Final

Top goalscorers

See also 
 1940 Football Championship of the Ukrainian SSR
 Soviet Cup
 Ukrainian Cup

Notes

References

External links 
 Information source 

1940
Cup
1940 domestic association football cups